Jean-Léon Émeric  was a French naval officer.

Career 
In late 1808, Émeric, ranking Lieutenant, served as first officer on the frigate Junon. Under Jean-Baptiste-Augustin Rousseau, he sailed for a cruise from le Havre to Cherbourg, and then ferrying troops from Cherbourg to Basse-Terre. On 20 December 1808, Junon fought the British 18-gun corvette HMS St Christopher, but did not give chase for fear of lacking wind and exposing himself to the British blockade. Junon arrived at the Saintes in mid-January 1809, and departed on 7 February. The next day, she was detected by the brigs HMS Asp and Supérieure, who shadowed Junon and harassed her. The cannonade attracted the attention of the frigates HMS Latona and Horatio, who gave chased and started the action of 10 February 1809. Émeric assumed command when Rousseau was mortally wounded, and fought until his mainmast collapsed; surrounded by three opponents, Émeric struck his colours. The mizzen and foremasts collapsed soon after the ensign had been hoisted down.

In 1813, Émeric had been promoted to Commander, and served in the division of Cherbourg, under contre-amiral Amable Troude, commanding the frigate Iphigénie. In early 1814, he led a two-frigate squadron comprising Iphigénie and Alcmène, under Commander Ducrest de Villeneuve, for a cruise between the Azores and Cap-Vert, off Guinea. Iphigénie escaped, but from their capture of Alcmène the British learnt her planned route, and managed to bring her into action on 20 January, capturing her.

In 1818, Émeric captained the fluyt Ariège for a cruise between Genoa and Palerme. In 1821, he had been promoted to captain and was in command of the Romulus, which had been razéed and renamed Guerrière. In 1822, he ferried Guilleau de Formont, French consul in Sardigna, from Toulon to Cagliari, and sailed on to Algiers to transport despatches, before returning to Toulon.

Sources and references

Notes

References

Bibliography 

 Fonds Marine. Campagnes (opérations ; divisions et stations navales ; missions diverses). Inventaire de la sous-série Marine BB4. Tome deuxième : BB4 1 à 482 (1790-1826) 
 
 
 

French Navy officers
French naval commanders of the Napoleonic Wars